The Senior Open de Portugal was a men's senior (over 50) professional golf tournament on the European Senior Tour. It was held just once, in September 2014, at the Hotel Palace of Vidago, Vidago, Chaves, Portugal. The winner was Tim Thelen who won the first prize of €33,750 out of total prize-money of €225,000.

Winners

External links
Coverage on the European Senior Tour's official site

Former European Senior Tour events
Golf tournaments in Portugal
Recurring sporting events established in 2014
Recurring sporting events disestablished in 2014
Defunct sports competitions in Portugal